Hannibal Vaivao is an American rugby union player for Old Glory DC of Major League Rugby (MLR). His position is at prop.

Vaivao was a former rugby league footballer prop for the Washington DC Slayers and Northern Virginia Eagles in the USA Rugby League. 

He also played American football for the Southeast Missouri State Redhawks and PAC in rugby union.

References

External links 
 (archived by web.archive.org) Hannibal Vaivao Southeast Missouri Redhawks

1987 births
American rugby union players
American rugby league players
Washington DC Slayers players
Southeast Missouri State Redhawks football players
Northern Virginia Eagles players
Footballers who switched code
Sportspeople from Long Beach, California
Players of American football from Long Beach, California
Living people
Rugby league props
Rugby union props
Old Glory DC players